Bruce Williams and Terry Ree, alternately billed as both "Williams and Ree" and "The Indian and The White Guy", are a pair of American comedians. Since the late 1960s, they have performed throughout the United States.

Williams and Ree first met in 1968 at Black Hills State University in Spearfish, South Dakota, as members of a band who filled time between songs with comedy sketches. Their humor soon became more popular than their music. Much of the duo's banter plays upon the stereotypes held of Native Americans.

Williams and Ree have performed with the likes of Garth Brooks, The Oak Ridge Boys and Tim McGraw, and have made many television appearances on The Nashville Network. Their comedy albums include "The Best of Williams and Ree", "Taking Reservations" and "Way Up Norsk". They also made two independent films in South Dakota, "Williams and Ree, The Movie" and "Totem Ree-Call".

Williams and Ree currently perform throughout the United States and Canada at Native American gaming venues and fairs. They are the regular hosts of the Craven Country Jamboree in Craven, Saskatchewan, and Country Thunder festivals in Wisconsin and Arizona. They are also regulars at the Norsk Hostfest in Minot, ND.

External links
 Official site

Living people
American comedy duos
American comedy musical groups
American musical duos
Musical groups from South Dakota
Black Hills State University alumni
Native American male actors
Year of birth missing (living people)